Abdoul Karim Sylla may refer to:
 Abdoul Karim Sylla (footballer, born 1981), Guinean footballer
 Abdoul Karim Sylla (footballer, born 1992), Guinean-Dutch footballer